Shourya may refer to:
 Shourya (2010 film), an Indian Kannada-language action film
 Shourya (2016 film), a Telugu romantic thriller film